The Mercedes-Benz OM 352 is a 5.7 litre inline-6 cylinder 4-stroke Diesel engine, made by Daimler-Benz.

Development 
It is one of many models in the 300 series of engines, which were developed during and after World War II, while specifically the OM352 was revealed in 1964. The OM352's lineage can be traced back to the OM311, itself an  inline-six engine. The OM352 has many applications, including marine, military, municipal, and agricultural vehicles, as well as stationary settings. The engine has differing trim and power levels, affording designations such as OM 352A a variant fitted with a turbocharger, or the OM352 LA, which is fitted with an intercooler and a turbocharger. (List of Mercedes-Benz engines.)

The engine is water-cooled, and is produced using cast-iron cylinder block, with cast-in cylinders. The engine utilizes diesel fuel delivered in a direct injection method from a Bosch PES style inline injection pump. The cylinder head is a single unit for all cylinders, and the cylinder head cover and air intake are shared by a single cast aluminum alloy. Exhaust ports 2&3 and 4&5 are siamesed together, presenting an exhaust manifold with only four outlets.

The crankshaft is a precision forged unit running in seven three-layer bearings, with counterweights bolted onto the crank webs, much like any other diesel motor of its vintage. The middle bearing is also the thrust bearing. The connecting rods are of a split design, with bronze bushings for the piston pin.

OM314 
In 1965, a four-cylinder variant derived from the six cylinder OM352 was introduced, the OM314.

Licensed production 
The OM352 was also one of many Mercedes engines licensed in 1979 for manufacture by Atlantis Diesel Engines (ADE) in South Africa. These were known as ADE 352 and are virtually identical to the Mercedes engines. Recently the OM352 was licensed by TATA for use in their 713S Trucks. These are manufactured by TATA but however have slight differences like the weights no longer being bolted to but rather part of the crank and no holes for oil sprayers in the block. These modifications are likely to reduce complexity and cost of engine production.

Common output power can vary from  depending on the fuel delivery and air charge options. Higher output can be achieved through special modifications, however engine longevity may be affected with such non-factory modifications.

Improved engines developed after the OM314 and OM352 include the OM364 (4 cyl.) and OM366 (6 cyl.), which look extremely similar in appearance and marked the final stage of development for the 300 series engines due to emissions requirements. Mercedes Benz 900 series engines are the successors of engines such as the OM300 series.

OM352 variants for the German market

Technical specifications

References

OM352
Diesel engines by model
Straight-six engines